The Silver City is a 1956 memoir and historical piece written by Ion Idriess. It was based on Idriess' experiences of growing up in Broken Hill. It is also a general history of the city.

References

External links
The Silver City at AustLit

1956 non-fiction books
Books by Ion Idriess
Australian memoirs
Books about cities
Broken Hill, New South Wales
History of Broken Hill
Angus & Robertson books